Petropavlovka is a rural locality (a selo) and the administrative center of Petropavlovskoye Rural Settlement, Ostrogozhsky District, Voronezh Oblast, Russia. The population was 678 as of 2010. There are 11 streets.

Geography 
Petropavlovka is located 21 km northeast of Ostrogozhsk (the district's administrative centre) by road. Korotoyak is the nearest rural locality.

References 

Rural localities in Ostrogozhsky District